Almamellék is a village in Baranya County, Hungary.

References

External links 
 Local statistics 

Populated places in Baranya County